The 1929 Tennessee Volunteers football team (variously "Tennessee", "UT" or the "Vols") represented the University of Tennessee in the 1929 college football season. Playing as a member of the Southern Conference (SoCon), the team was led by head coach Robert Neyland, in his fourth year, and played their home games at Shields–Watkins Field in Knoxville, Tennessee. The 1928 Vols won nine, lost zero and tied one game (9–0–1 overall, 6–0–1 in the SoCon). In a virtual repeat of the previous year, a tie with Kentucky spoiled Tennessee's perfect season.  Playing eight home games, the Volunteers outscored their opponents 330 to 13 and posted eight shutouts.

Schedule

Players

Line

Backfield

References

Tennessee
Tennessee Volunteers football seasons
College football undefeated seasons
Tennessee Volunteers football